Edith Haldeman (April 17, 1905 – October 1984) was an American child actress of the early silent film era. She appeared in 36 films between 1909 and 1916.

She appeared in Native American films such as A Mohawk's Way (1910), and Red Man's View (1909), by D.W. Griffith. She stars along Claire McDowell in His Trust (1911).

Filmography

References

External links

1905 births
1984 deaths
American child actresses
American film actresses
American silent film actresses
20th-century American actresses